Jerry L. White Center is a high school in Detroit, Michigan. It is a part of Detroit Public Schools. The school serves students with disabilities aged 14–19. It includes severely cognitively impaired, severely multiply impaired, moderately cognitively impaired, visually impaired, and hearing-impaired students. It was established in 2005.

References

External links

 Jerry L. White Center High School - Detroit Public Schools

Schools for the deaf in the United States
High schools in Detroit
Public high schools in Michigan
2005 establishments in Michigan
Detroit Public Schools Community District
Educational institutions established in 2005